Ivanovo State Power Engineering University is a higher education institution in the city of Ivanovo, founded on 24 June 1930 on the basis of the mechanical engineering faculty of the Ivanovo-Voznesensk Polytechnic Institute. Until 1992, it was called the Ivanovo Power Engineering Institute. V. I. Lenin.

History 

Ivanovo State Power Engineering University was founded on the basis of the Mechanical Engineering Faculty of the Ivanovo-Voznesensky Polytechnic Institute in 1930 and until 1992 was called the Ivanovo Power Engineering Institute. P. I. Plekhanov was the rector of the institute.

In the USSR 
The Ivanovo-Voznesensk Polytechnic Institute was established in 1918 on the basis of the Riga Technical University evacuated to Ivanovo.

In 1931 Ya. F. Kedrov was appointed rector of the institute. At the same time, construction began on building "A" in the first Workers' settlement. In 1932, the institute came under the jurisdiction of the People's Commissariat of Heavy Industry of the USSR. In 1933, the Faculty of Electrical Engineering and Thermal Engineering were founded, and F. E. Okhotnikov was appointed rector.

In 1934, the evening department of the institute was closed, and in 1935 the general technical faculty was opened. PS Borodynya was appointed Rector of the institute. By 1936, the teaching staff of the institute had doubled, and the number of students had grown by a third.

In 1937, the institute was headed by N.L. Spektor, he passed into the jurisdiction of the People's Commissariat of the Defense Industry. The structure of the institute was reorganized - the general technical faculty was closed, the heat engineering specialty was abolished, postgraduate studies were restored and a new specialty was introduced - "Power supply of industrial enterprises", the training lasted five years and two months.

In 1938, the institute was headed by A.N. Zverev, in the same year the Ivanovo Energy Institute celebrated its twentieth anniversary, in connection with which it was named after V.I. Lenin.

In January 1939, the institute was transferred to the People's Commissariat for the Shipbuilding Industry, and in the summer of the same year it was transferred to the People's Commissariat of Power Plants and the Electrical Industry. In 1939, G. K. Filonenko defended his first doctoral dissertation.

In 1941, F. I. Isaev was appointed rector of the institute, at the same time the construction of student dormitory No. 1 for 350 people was completed, and the training of students in the specialty “thermal power engineering” began again. At the beginning of the war, 330 teachers and students went to the front, hospitals were placed in half of the academic building and student dormitories, classes were held in two shifts, and the training period was reduced to three years and four months.

After the Great Patriotic War, with the development of the Soviet nuclear project, the Ivanovo Institute became the leading educational institution for training personnel for nuclear power plants under construction and operational personnel for the operation of nuclear power plants.

In Russian federation 

In 1992, the Ivanovo Power Engineering Institute was given the status of a state technical university.

In 1993, the work of the Russian-German seminar "Reliability of energy systems" began.

In 1994, Ivanovo State Power Engineering University received a grant to conduct educational exchanges from the United States of America News Agency.

In 1997, a doctoral program was opened in the specialties "Electrical complexes and systems, including their control and regulation", "Automation of technological processes and production", "Computer-aided design systems".

In 2000, on the basis of the Ivanovo Machine-Building College (IvMT), the Machine-Building College of the Ivanovo State Power Engineering University was formed. In 2001, the faculty of advanced training of teachers was opened, the development of the university is in accordance with the principles of education quality management.

In 2005, a full-scale simulator of the power unit was donated to the Ivanovo State Power Engineering University by the Kalinin Nuclear Power Plant, and an interfaculty training center was founded. Thanks to this, the structure of training specialists for the nuclear power industry at ISPU is consistent with the requirements for training operational personnel at nuclear power plants, and the training program is adapted to the training programs for VIUR, VIUT and complies with the requirements of NPP guidelines.

In 2007, a military training center was opened at the university to train officers of the signal troops serving under a contract.

In 2008, the university successfully passed an external audit and certification of the quality management system by experts from the European Foundation for Quality Management (EFQM).

In 2010, the specialties "Industrial Electronics" and "Nuclear Power Plants" were the first in Russia to be awarded the European quality mark EUR-ACE.

In 2010, ISPU became a member of the EU4M consortium - ERASMUS Mundus Master in Mechatronic and Micro-Mechatronic Systems.

In 2011, ISPU, along with 12 leading Russian universities that train personnel for the country's nuclear industry, entered the "Consortium of flagship universities of the State Corporation Rosatom".

Ratings 

In 2014, the Expert RA agency included the university in the list of the best higher educational institutions of the Commonwealth of Independent States, where it was assigned the E rating class.

Faculties and departments

TEF – Faculty of Thermal Power Engineering 
The faculty was founded in 1948.

 Department of Automation of Technological Processes
 Department of Chemistry and Chemical Technologies in Energy
 Department of Thermal Power Plants
 Department of Steam and Gas Turbines
 Department of Theoretical Foundations of Heat Engineering
 Department of Industrial Heat Power Engineering
 Educational and Scientific Center for Simulators in Energy (UNCT)

EMF – Faculty of Electromechanics 
The faculty was founded in 1956.

 Department of Electronics and Microprocessor Systems
 Department of Mechanical Engineering Technology
 Department of Electric Drive and Automation of Industrial Installations
 Department of Electromechanics
 Department of Theoretical and Applied Mechanics
 Department of Applied Mathematics

EEF - Faculty of Electrical Power Engineering 
The faculty was founded in 1956.

 Department of Power Plants, Substations and Diagnostics of Electrical Equipment
 Department of Electrical Systems
 Department of automatic control of electric power systems
 Department of Theoretical Foundations of Electrical Engineering and Electrotechnology
 Department of High-Voltage Power Engineering, Electrical Engineering and Electrophysics

IVTF — Faculty of Informatics and Computer Engineering 
The faculty was founded in 1991.

 Department of Control Systems
 Department of Computer Systems Software
 Department of Information Technology
 Department of Higher Mathematics
 Department of High-Performance Computing Systems
 Department of Intensive English Studies
 Department of Design and Graphics

IFF — Faculty of Engineering and Physics 
The faculty was founded in 1991.

 Department of Nuclear Power Plants
 Department of Energy, Heat Technologies and Gas Supply
 Department of Physics
 Department of Life Safety
 Department of French

FEU - Faculty of Economics and Management 
The faculty was founded in 1991.

 Department of General Economic Theory
 Department of Economics and Enterprise Organization
 Department of Management and Marketing
 Department of Public Relations, Political Science, Psychology and Law
 Department of Sociology
 Department of National History and Culture
 Department of Philosophy
 Department of Foreign Languages
 Department of Physical Education
 Center for Economics and Finance
 Training Center "Management in Energy"

The university also has a military department and a military training center.

References

Links 
 website 

Educational institutions established in 1930
1930 establishments in Russia
Nuclear technology in the Soviet Union
Energy in Russia
Universities in Ivanovo Oblast
Engineering universities and colleges in Russia